San Carlos, officially the City of San Carlos, is a 3rd class component city in the province of Pangasinan, Philippines. According to the 2020 census, it has a population of 205,424 people.

It is the most populated city in Pangasinan and the entire Ilocos Region. Reaching the 200 thousand population mark in 2020, the city has obtained the key census requirement for a highly urbanized city qualification.

History

Pre-colonial
In 1718, Binalatongan was renamed (the Municipality [town] of) San Carlos, in honor of Saint Charles Borromeo.

1960s
During the 1960s, the Municipality of San Carlos divided into two precincts. In 1965, the smaller precinct became legally incorporated as the Municipality of Basista by virtue of RA 4866.

Cityhood

In 1966, the larger precinct became legally incorporated as San Carlos City by virtue of Republic Act No. 4487.

Contemporary
On April 28, 2007, San Carlos City's former mayor, Julian V. Resuello, was assassinated during an event at the city's plaza. He later died after two days.

Geography

Barangays
San Carlos is politically subdivided into 86 barangays. These barangays are headed by elected officials: Barangay Captain, Barangay Council, whose members are called Barangay Councilors. All are elected every three years.

Climate

Demographics

Economy

The city is also called the "Mango-Bamboo Capital of the Philippines", San Carlos has the largest number of mango trees - their fruits are among the most flavorsome in the country - and a thriving bamboocraft industry. An agro-industrial city, San Carlos also engages in livestock raising, crop production, inland fishing, pottery, food processing, tourism, commerce and trade, small-scale manufacturing, and flour-making. San Carlos is said to have an ideal investment potential because of its large land area, big population and strategic location, being in the center of Pangasinan.

Government
San Carlos, belonging to the third congressional district of the province of Pangasinan, is governed by a mayor designated as its local chief executive and by a municipal council as its legislative body in accordance with the Local Government Code. The mayor, vice mayor, and the councilors are elected directly by the people through an election which is being held every three years.

Elected officials

Tourism 

Interesting spots of the town include:
 424-year-old Saint Dominic de Guzman Parish Church
 Speaker Eugenio Perez Memorial Park
 City Plaza
 Quadricentennial Arch in Bolingit
 Binalatongan Ruins in San Juan
 Philippine Fruit Corporation at Barangay Pagal

Giant mango pie
On April 26, 2011, 86 barangays in San Carlos baked a 100-square-meter mango pie — filling a gymnasium and setting the largest mango pie world record (400 sqm na mango pie, iniluto sa San Carlos City). Natives used 400 trays of mango pies (10 kilos each, P 400,000, in a 100-square-meter table and shared by more than 1,200). It highlighted San Carlos City's Mango-Bamboo Festival 2011.

Transportation

Bus companies with service to and from Manila include Five Star Bus Company, Dagupan Bus Company, Fermina Express, Pangasinan Solid North Transit, Inc., First North Luzon Transit, .

Jeepneys are available for commuters to its neighboring towns, like Calasiao and Malasiqui. Tricycles are available for commuters to barrios and barangays.

Gallery

References

External links

 City Profile at the National Competitiveness Council of the Philippines
 San Carlos at the Pangasinan Government Website
 Local Governance Performance Management System 
 [ Philippine Standard Geographic Code]
 Philippine Census Information

 
Cities in Pangasinan
Populated places established in 1578
1578 establishments in the Philippines
Populated places on the Agno River
Component cities in the Philippines